Fish Creek Bridge may refer to:

Fish Creek Covered Bridge, in Hundred, West Virginia, listed on the NRHP in West Virginia
Fish Creek Bridge (Tortilla Flat, Arizona), listed on the NRHP in Arizona
Fish Creek Bridge (Salem, Iowa), listed on the NRHP in Iowa

See also
 Fish Creek Dam, in Carey, Idaho, listed on the NRHP in Idaho